Dil Banjaara ( lit: Wander Heart), previously entitled Gypsy is a Pakistani drama serial that was aired on Hum TV on 14 October 2016, preceded by Jhoot for 2016 Television season. It is directed by Siraj-ul-Haque, written by Faiza Iftikhar and produced by Momina Duraid as a night programming all under her production company MD Productions. It stars Adnan Malik as Sikandar an aspiring photographer along with Sanam Saeed as female lead and Mira Sethi as supporting character.

Plot
Nida is a girl with a lot of dreams; she wants to travel around the world, write poetry and live carefree. Unfortunately, she has a lot of responsibilities. She lives with a physically challenged father, mentally disturbed mother, and a strict Tayi Ammi; and to top it all up, she has a Phupo too who wants Nida to marry as soon as possible. Nida has other plans though. During her trip to Nepal, she meets Sikander, called Sikki, who shares the same passions as Nida. He lives with his aunt, Mehtab. Mehtab has raised Sikander like her own son as Sikander’s parents had died while he was very young. Mehtab’s daughter, Shama is interested in Sikander and believes he will marry her one day. But Sikki's heart lies elsewhere and the feelings are reciprocated. One day, Sikki calls Shama to meet him so he can tell her that he doesn't wants to marry her and that she is mistaken that he loves her. Sikki is very nervous because he considers Shama his best friend and does not want to hurt her. He tells Shama to sit in the car but before he can tell her anything, Shama sees flowers across the road and runs to buy them but gets hit by a car and gets physically disabled. After her accident, Sikki feels guilty and thinks that whatever happened to Shama is because of him. He starts to take care of Shama and tells his aunt Mehtab that he will marry Shama. In the meantime, arrangements have been made for Nida to marry her cousin. Will true love find its way?

Cast 
 Sanam Saeed as Nida Nafees
 Adnan Malik as Sikandar
 Mira Sethi as Shama
 Danial Afzal Khan as Zaman, Nida's Cousin
 Sakina Samo as Nishat, Mukhtar & Nafees' sister
 Mohsin Raza Gillani as Nafees, Nida's Father
 Hina Khawaja Bayat as Fasiha Nafees, Nida's Mother
 Samina Ahmad as Zubaida Mukhtar, Nida's Aunt
 Madiha Rizvi as Zahra Mukhtar, Nida's Cousin 
 Annie Zaidi as Mehtab 
 Munawar Saeed as Mukhtar Bhai, Nida's Uncle
 Noor Ul Ain Zaidi as Sumbul's friend
 Hanan Sameed as Ayaz
 Beena Masroor as Ayaz's mother
 Shermeen Ali as Meesha
 Rashida Tabassum
 Iqra Atiq
 Sarah Ali
 Mahjbeen Beena Masroor
 Hannan Sameed as Ayaz
 Asma Saif
 Adnan Saeed as Deepak Panhwar

Production

Casting
Adnan Malik was cast for the character of Sikandar, an aspiring photographer. In early January 2016, describing his role Malik said, "I read a bunch of scripts, there was also interest from across the border but nothing clicked quite like Gypsy." He further said "I play the role of Sikander, who's an aspiring photographer, a part of him that resonates with me because that's what peaked my interest in the arts when my father bought me my first camera. He's a very rugged, outdoorsy kinda guy, very different from Khalil. There's just this lightness to him. So the show revolves around this guy who's a bit of a wanderer and his equation with two ladies, a non-traditional love triangle of sorts." 
It  was later announced that actress Sanam Saeed had replaced Mawra Hocane. Saeed, speaking about Gypsy, said "Basically I was offered the script initially, but I couldn't do it back then. However, later when Mawra (Hocane) got caught up with something else and I was available, I signed the project,”. “I hadn't done easy-breezy love stories previously, so Gypsy offered something new.”. She further went on to say that "My character is of a girl who's a gypsy at heart. She's a wanderer and a free spirit. She is very much attached to her parents and unlike other characters in the serial, she doesn't retaliate. Her parents are very supportive, and even when she disagrees, she understands their point. So there's no struggle; it doesn't have any heavy moral or drama. There is a little bit of conflict, but no negativity or a bechari of any sort." and "Mohsin Gilani plays my father's character, whereas the brilliant Hina Bayat will be essaying my mother's role. She has always been known for her versatile characters, and her role in Gyspy is also something completely different from what she has done previously," she commented. "It also has a strong supporting cast; we have Madiha Rizvi, Samina Ahmed and Munawar Siddiqui as well.".

Filming
Production on series began in 25 May 2016 in various cities across the country including Nepal's popular Madhyapur Thimi and Bhaktapur. Teasers were released on 6 October 2016 with the name [Dil Banjaara], replaced by name [Gypsy] and was finalized to replace Jhoot and was aired on 14 October 2016.

Availability 
The show is available to stream online on:-
 MX Player app
 iflix app (till 2017)
 Starzplay

Reception 

While reviewing the first episode, A reviewer from DAWN Images praised the strong characteristion, Iftikhar's writing and acting performances of Saeed and Sethi.

See also
 2016 in Pakistani television 
 List of programs broadcast by Hum TV

References

External links 
 
 MD Productions

Hum TV
Hum Network Limited
Pakistani telenovelas
Pakistani romantic drama television series
Serial drama television series
MD Productions
Television series by MD Productions
Television series created by Momina Duraid
Urdu-language television shows
2017 Pakistani television series endings
2016 Pakistani television series debuts
Hum TV original programming